This is a list of French television related events from 2011.

Events
19 March - Singer Matt Pokora and his partner Katrina Patchett win the first series of Danse avec les stars.
28 June - Matthew Raymond-Barker wins the second and final series of X Factor.
14 October - Marie Garet wins the fifth series of Secret Story.
19 November - Singer Shy'm and her partner Maxime Dereymez win the second series of Danse avec les stars.
14 December - 13-year-old singer Marina Dalmas wins the sixth series of La France a un incroyable talent

Debuts
12 February - Danse avec les stars (2011–present)

Television shows

1940s
Le Jour du Seigneur (1949–present)

1950s
Présence protestante (1955-)

1970s
30 millions d'amis (1976-2016)

2000s
Plus belle la vie (2004–present)
La France a un incroyable talent (2006–present)
Secret Story (2007–present)

Ending this year
X Factor (2009-2011)

Births

Deaths

Évelyne Pagès

See also
2011 in France

References